Cipanas is a district in Lebak Regency, Banten Province, Indonesia and is the easternmost district in the regency. Cipanas is directly adjacent to Jasinga in Bogor Regency, West Java.

Villages
Cipanas consists of 14 villages namely:
 Bintangresmi
 Bintangsari
 Cipanas
 Giriharja
 Girilaya
 Harumsari
 Haurgajrug
 Jayapura
 Luhurjaya
 Malangsari
 Pasirhaur
 Sipayung
 Sukasari
 Talagahiyang

References

lebak Regency
districts of Banten